Paranyctycia is a genus of moths of the family Noctuidae.

Species
 Paranyctycia orbiculosa Hreblay & Ronkay, 1998

References
Natural History Museum Lepidoptera genus database
Paranyctycia at funet

Xyleninae